Ato Kwamina Yanney Snr, also known simply as Ato Yanney (born 22 January 1933, in the central region of Ghana) was an independent film maker and one of the pioneers of Ghana movie industry.

Education 
He studied screenplay writing and directing at the London School of Film Technique.
He later obtained a degree in film critique and appreciation. He studied at the Feature and Documentary Film Studios in Poland.

Career 
He worked as a local recruit in the United Kingdom at the Ghana High Commission. 
He wrote short stories that were broadcast on BBC Home Service.  Example's that can be cited are the Ominous sneeze and It came from Heaven Ato returned to Ghana and joined the Ghana Film Industry in 1963. He later became the head of production of the corporation. He mooted an idea that became the National Film and Television Institute (NAFTI). And as a consultant with the Ghana Broadcasting Corporation.

Works 
In 1984 he shot "His Majesty's Sergeant" on PANAVISION (35MM), the first of its kind in Ghana  with the re-mastered and television version(2005) registered under the British Board of Film Classification (BBFC). This work has been screened for research purposes at Harvard University Center for African Studies, Southern Methodist University in Dallas and Boston University. After its disappearance from the British film Laboratory for 25 years, it was launched in the United Kingdom by  Big "H" Entertainment and Flamboyant Films in March 2011.

 No Tears For Ananse (Screenplay)
 Genesis Chapter X (Screenplay)
 Market Day
 Cult of Twins
 Population Census
 Golden Pod
 Rainbow Colors
 New Breed
 Death on Wheels
 The Last Show
Panoply of Ghana
Old Simpson Series(writer)

Achievements 
During the centenary of world cinema, he was awarded with a Certificate of Distinction in Scriptwriting. He was awarded with a GAFTA Osagyefo citation for promoting pan-Africanism. He was honored for contributing to the development of the Ghanaian Film Industry in film production and directing at the 40th anniversary of the industry.

Family life
He married Mrs. Paulina Yanney née Amegayibor, in the early 1970s, and the marriage was blessed with four children, Papa, Ato Yanney Jnr. Bianca and Kofi. He was previously married in England to Margaret Mead of blessed memory, and the affair produced three children by name Yvonne Yanney, Sidney and Velma.

Death
He died on the 10th April 2011 at the Tema General Hospital (Ghana) after a short illness.

References 

1933 births
Living people
Alumni of the London Film School
Ghanaian film directors